Strong Tower Radio is a non-profit  network of Christian radio stations in Michigan and Illinois. Much of Strong Tower Radio's programming is from 3ABN.

Stations
Strong Tower Radio operates a total of 14 radio stations and 1 television station (8 standard radio stations, 5 radio translators, and 1 low-power television station W23EB-D in Michigan, and 1 radio translator in Illinois).

Translators

References

External links
Strong Tower Radio's official website

Christian radio stations in the United States
American radio networks
Conservative media in the United States
Seventh-day Adventist media
Seventh-day Adventist organizations